The 1992 Sam Houston State Bearkats football team represented Sam Houston State University as a member of the Southland Conference during the 1992 NCAA Division I-AA football season. Led by 11th-year head coach Ron Randleman, the Bearkats compiled an overall record of 6–3–2 with a mark of 3–2–2 in conference play, and finished fourth in the Southland.

Schedule

References

Sam Houston State
Sam Houston Bearkats football seasons
Sam Houston State Bearkats football